Isaac Gosset may refer to:
 Isaac Gosset (bibliographer)
 Isaac Gosset (sculptor)